Hans Schwarzmann (born 30 January 1925) was a Swiss boxer. He competed in the men's light heavyweight event at the 1948 Summer Olympics. At the 1948 Summer Olympics, after receiving a bye in the Round of 32, he lost in the Round of 16 to Hugh O'Hagan of Ireland.

References

External links
 

1925 births
Possibly living people
Swiss male boxers
Olympic boxers of Switzerland
Boxers at the 1948 Summer Olympics
Light-heavyweight boxers